Kenric was established in 1965 and is made up of a network of social groups for lesbians throughout the United Kingdom. Members are of all ages, although mainly due to the long-running nature of the network it is most popular with women over 30 years old. It is often the only lesbian social outlet in areas where there is not much visible gay and lesbian presence.

Members 

Throughout the country the local groups are managed by a network volunteers, who organise discos, club nights, walks, reading groups, golf tournaments, discussion groups and other such events to suit the locality. These women are from all walks of life, professions, ages and social backgrounds.

Members of the network keep in touch via a national monthly magazine, as well as regional newsletters. The basic philosophy is that no lesbian should feel isolated or alone, no matter where they are. The group now has over 1200 subscribers, located all over the country and overseas.

Major events 

Each year the organisation hosts major event that include a Christmas ball in London and an event in Eastbourne to mark the end of the International Women's Open tennis tournament. These events are open to women who are both members and non-members.

History 

Many of the early members of Kenric were members of the Gateways club in Chelsea. The name "Kenric" was formed from joining the regional names of Kensington and Richmond, which is where the group was originally formed in 1965. Some of the early members were also members of the Minorities Research Group (which published the magazine Arena Three), but were keen to move away from research into lesbianism and develop the more social aspects. A former member believes that a group calling themselves The Sisters of Kranzchen may have been forerunners of Kenric.

Newsletter 

Kenric soon started to connect members via a newsletter. Group co-founders Diana Chapman and Esma Langley wrote many of the first articles using a variety of assumed names.

See also

List of LGBT organizations

References

External links
 The Kenric Website

LGBT history in the United Kingdom
1965 establishments in the United Kingdom
Lesbian organisations based in the United Kingdom
Lesbian history
History of women in the United Kingdom